David G. Stork is a scientist and author, who has made contributions to machine learning, pattern recognition, computer vision, artificial intelligence, computational optics, image analysis of fine art, and related fields.

Education 
Stork received his BS in Physics from the Massachusetts Institute of Technology with a thesis under the direction of Dr. Edwin H. Land, President and CEO of the Polaroid Corporation, and his MS and PhD in Physics from the University of Maryland, College Park with a thesis under the direction of  David S. Falk.

Career 
Stork has held full-time and visiting faculty positions in Physics, Mathematics, Computer Science, Electrical Engineering, Statistics, Neuroscience, Psychology, and Art and Art History variously at Wellesley and Swarthmore Colleges and Clark, Boston, and Stanford Universities.  He has held  corporate positions as Chief Scientist at Ricoh Innovations and Fellow at Rambus, Inc.  He has served on Advisory Boards of the startup companies,  NeuralWare, Neural Applications Corporation, and Metalenz.

Memberships and awards
Stork is a Fellow of the Institute for Electrical and Electronics Engineers (IEEE), Optical Society of America (OSA)., International Society for Optics and Photonics (SPIE), Society for Imaging Science and Technology (IS&T), International Association for Pattern Recognition (IAPR), and International Academy, Research, and Industry Association (IARIA), Asia-Pacific Artificial Intelligence Association, and 2022 Djerassi Fellow, and has been Senior Member of the Association for Computing Machinery (ACM) and Member of the Association for the Advancement of Artificial Intelligence (AAAI).  He was awarded the 2017 Industrial Distinguished Leader Award from the Asia Pacific Signal and Information Processing Association (APSIPA)

Selected works 
Pattern classification (2nd ed.) by R. O. Duda, P. E. Hart, and D. G. Stork (Wiley, 2001)
Seeing the light:  Optics in nature, photography, color, vision and holography (2nd ed.) by D. S. Falk, D. R. Brill, and D. G. Stork (Echo Point Press, 2019)
Physics of Sound (3rd ed.) by R. O. Berg and D. G. Stork (Prentice-Hall, 2004)
HAL's Legacy:  2001's computer as dream and reality, edited by D. G. Stork, with a Foreword by Arthur C. Clarke (MIT Press, 1996)
 "2001:  HAL's Legacy", documentary film created by D. Kennard and D. G. Stork for PBS Television (South Carolina PBS Television, 2001)
Speechreading by humans and machines, edited by D. G. Stork and M. E. Hennecke (Springer, 1996)
Computer image analysis in the study of art, edited by D. G. Stork and J. Coddington (SPIE Press, 2008)
Computer vision and image analysis of art, edited by D. G. Stork, J. Coddington and A. Bentkowska-Kafel (SPIE Press, 2010)
Computer vision and image analysis of art II, edited by D. G. Stork, J. Coddington and A. Bentkowska-Kafel (SPIE Press, 2011)

References 

Year of birth missing (living people)
Living people